Morgan Jones may refer to:

Morgan Jones (actor, born 1879) (1879–1951), American silent film actor and screenwriter
Morgan Jones (actor, born 1928) (1928–2012), American film and television actor
Morgan Jones (broadcaster), Welsh television presenter
Morgan Jones (British politician) (1886–1939), Labour Member of Parliament for Caerphilly, 1921–1939
Morgan Jones (American politician) (1830–1894), United States Representative from New York, 1865–1867, Democrat
Morgan Jones (alpine skier) (born 1968), British former alpine skier
Morgan Jones (railroad builder) (1839–1926), American railroad builder
Morgan Jones (cricketer) (1829–1905), Welsh cricketer
Morgan Jones (rugby union) (born 1999), Welsh rugby union player
Morgan Jones (The Walking Dead), fictional character from The Walking Dead franchise
Morgan Jones, pseudonym of Dylan Davies, the fraudulent main source on the retracted 60 Minutes report on the Benghazi Attack in 2012